Hardy Murfree (June 5, 1752 – April 6, 1809) was a lieutenant colonel from North Carolina during the American Revolutionary War.

Early life
Murfree was born on June 5, 1752 at Murfree's Landing, North Carolina, later renamed Murfreesboro. His parents were William Murfree and Mary Moore.

Military career
Murfree, a lieutenant in the Hertford County militia when the Revolutionary War began, was commissioned on September 1, 1775, as a captain in the 2nd North Carolina Regiment of the Continental Army. The regiment was commanded by Colonel Robert Howe, who was later a major general. Murfree saw action at the Battle of Monmouth on June 28, 1778, and achieved his greatest renown for leading a successful diversionary attack against British defenses in the Battle of Stony Point on July 15, 1779. He was then a major serving under General Anthony Wayne, and was soon thereafter promoted to lieutenant colonel.

On July 17, 1781, British forces led by Banastre Tarleton and Tarleton's Raiders attacked Maney's Neck on the Meherrin River near Murfree's Landing.  Murfree led the militia that repulsed the attack at Skinner's Bridge.

Around 1807, Murfree migrated to Williamson County, Tennessee, living on land granted to him after the American Revolution, and remained there until his death in 1809.

Murfree was a member of the North Carolina chapter of the Society of the Cincinnati. He was a Freemason for all of his adult life, active in both North Carolina and Tennessee.

Personal life
Murfree married Sally Brickell on February 17, 1780. They had seven children: William Hardy Murfree (1781), Fanny Noailles Murfree (1783), Mary Moore Murfree (1786), Matthias Brickell Murfree (1788), Sally Murfree (1793), Lavinia Bembury Murfree (1795-1881), and Martha Long Ann Coakley Murfree (1801). Their great-granddaughter was the noted Tennessee writer Mary Noailles Murfree (1850–1922). His wife Sally died on March 29, 1802.

Death and legacy
Murfree died on April 6, 1809. In 1811 the Tennessee State Legislature renamed the town of Cannonsburgh to Murfreesborough (later shortened to Murfreesboro) in his honor.

References

External links

Murfreesboro, North Carolina
Murfreesboro, Tennessee

1752 births
1809 deaths
People from Murfreesboro, North Carolina
People from Williamson County, Tennessee
Continental Army officers from North Carolina